= United Germany =

United Germany may refer to either

- Unification of Germany, the unifying of the German empire in the 19th century
- German reunification, the reunification of East and West Germany in 1989–1990
